William Harold Pearsall  (23 July 1891 – 14 October 1964) was a British botanist, Quain Professor of Botany at University College London 1944–1957.

Awards and honours
Pearsall was elected a Fellow of the Royal Society in 1940. His nomination reads:

References 

1891 births
1964 deaths
British botanists
Fellows of the Royal Society
Fellows of the Linnean Society of London
Academics of University College London
New Naturalist writers